Voskresenskoye is a rural locality (a village) in Kubenskoye Rural Settlement, Vologodsky District, Vologda Oblast, Russia. The population was 18 as of 2002.

Geography 
The distance to Vologda is 48 km, to Kubenskoye is 16 km. Bugrino, Prokunino, Filino are the nearest rural localities.

References 

Rural localities in Vologodsky District